Dayalpur is a village in Phillaur. Phillaur is a city in the district Jalandhar of Indian state of Punjab.

About 
Dayalpur lies on the Phillaur-Nawa Shahar road which is almost 2 km from it.  The nearest railway station to Diyalpur is Phillaur railway station at a distance of 14 km.
Dayalpur Village established around 1704.

Post code 
Dayalpur's Post code is 144419

Maps

References 

 Official postal website of Indian Govt. with Dayalpur's details

Villages in Jalandhar district